Paynes Creek is a census-designated place (CDP) in Tehama County, California. The 2010 United States census reported Paynes Creek's population was 57.

History
A post office called Paynes Creek was established in 1890, and remained in operation until 1973. The town is named for the eponymous watercourse Payne's Creek.

Geography
According to the United States Census Bureau, the CDP covers an area of 3.4 square miles (8.9 km), 99.96% of it land and 0.04% of it water.

Demographics
The 2010 United States Census reported that Paynes Creek had a population of 57. The population density was 16.6 people per square mile (6.4/km). The racial makeup of Paynes Creek was 51 (89.5%) White, 0 (0.0%) African American, 2 (3.5%) Native American, 0 (0.0%) Asian, 0 (0.0%) Pacific Islander, 1 (1.8%) from other races, and 3 (5.3%) from two or more races.  Hispanic or Latino of any race were 7 persons (12.3%).

The Census reported that 57 people (100% of the population) lived in households, 0 (0%) lived in non-institutionalized group quarters, and 0 (0%) were institutionalized.

There were 24 households, out of which 6 (25.0%) had children under the age of 18 living in them, 15 (62.5%) were opposite-sex married couples living together, 1 (4.2%) had a female householder with no husband present, 2 (8.3%) had a male householder with no wife present.  There were 1 (4.2%) unmarried opposite-sex partnerships, and 0 (0%) same-sex married couples or partnerships. 6 households (25.0%) were made up of individuals, and 3 (12.5%) had someone living alone who was 65 years of age or older. The average household size was 2.38.  There were 18 families (75.0% of all households); the average family size was 2.78.

The population was spread out, with 11 people (19.3%) under the age of 18, 3 people (5.3%) aged 18 to 24, 13 people (22.8%) aged 25 to 44, 16 people (28.1%) aged 45 to 64, and 14 people (24.6%) who were 65 years of age or older.  The median age was 45.8 years. For every 100 females, there were 137.5 males.  For every 100 females age 18 and over, there were 142.1 males.

There were 34 housing units at an average density of 9.9 per square mile (3.8/km), of which 18 (75.0%) were owner-occupied, and 6 (25.0%) were occupied by renters. The homeowner vacancy rate was 0%; the rental vacancy rate was 33.3%.  32 people (56.1% of the population) lived in owner-occupied housing units and 25 people (43.9%) lived in rental housing units.

Politics
In the state legislature Paynes Creek is in the 4th Senate District, represented by Republican Doug LaMalfa, and in the 2nd Assembly District, represented by Republican Jim Nielsen.

Ecology
The Payne's Creek vicinity contains forested reaches, and also provides habitat for numerous understory flora and fauna. An example wildflower found in the vicinity is the mariposa lily Calochortus luteus, which is at its northern limit at the location of the Payne's Creek watershed.

See also
Lane Fire

References

Census-designated places in Tehama County, California
Census-designated places in California